Pasikhan Rural District is a rural district (dehestan) in the Central District of Rasht County, Gilan Province, Iran. At the 2006 census, its population was 10,018, in 2,602 families. The rural district has 13 villages.

References 

Rural Districts of Gilan Province
Rasht County